Ospedale del Ceppo is a medieval hospital founded in 1277 in Pistoia, Tuscany, central Italy.

History
According to tradition, the Ospedale was founded in 1277 by the company of Santa Maria or "del Ceppo dei poveri" ("The offering trunk of the poor"). In 1345 documents mention ongoing works for a new cloister, oratory and domus (residence for women). It became the main city's hospital after the donations received in the wake of the Black Death of 1348.  Initially given to the cathedral chapter, from 1350 the commune of Pistoia tried to absorb direction of the company. After the conquest of Pistoia by the Republic of Florence (1401), the Florentines officially confirmed the lay status of the hospital. In 1456 the hospital administrators commissioned the Florentine architect Michelozzo di Bartolomeo a restoration of the building. The election of the spedalingo (rector) was often contended between the noble Pistoiese families, sometimes causing popular turmoil such as in 1498. In 1494 the Compagnia del Ceppo was expelled in 1494, the hospital administrated by the communal priori. In 1501 the hospital was submitted to the Hospital of Santa Maria Nuova in Florence; the Florentine spedalingo, Leonardo Buonafede, ordered in this period the realization of the frieze which is now the main feature of the monumental façade. In 1784 Grand Duke Pietro Leopoldo of Tuscany aggregated the hospital to a new entity including the other Pistoiese hospital of San Gregorio, the Spedali Riuniti di Pistoia, the spedalingo returning to be a Pistoiese.

Description 
The current complex is the result of a series of additions and restorations of the original 13th-century edifice, which corresponds to today's corsia di Sant'Atto, a large ward with big windows now existing in a 16th-century renovation. In the 15th century the wing and the current façade were added, with the Renaissance arcaded loggia built in 1502, inspired by the Ospedale degli Innocenti at Florence. The loggia is decorated by a ceramic glaze frieze executed from 1525 by Santi Buglioni: it portrays the seven works of mercy, mixed with scenes of the Virtues. A panel was replaced in 1586 by a new one, not in ceramic glaze. Also from 1525 are the tondoes by Giovanni della Robbia, depicting the Annunciation, the Glory of the Virgin, the Visitation and the Medici coat of arms. The corsia di San Leopoldo ("Ward of St. Leopold"), now the seat of the Pistoia Medical Academy, was originally intended for the contagious patients.

See also
 History of hospitals
 Medieval medicine of Western Europe#Hospital system

References

Hospital buildings completed in the 15th century
Buildings and structures in Pistoia
Renaissance architecture in Tuscany
Defunct hospitals in Italy
Hospitals established in the 13th century